The Moreas Motorway (designated: A7) is a motorway in Peloponnese, Greece. The A7 begins just west of the Isthmus of Corinth, branching off from Greek National Road 8A (which is now integrated into the Olympia Odos). It connects Corinth and Kalamata via Tripoli.

As part of the concession agreement between the Greek state and the consortium operating the motorway (Moreas S.A.), the latter is responsible for constructing, operating, maintaining and modernizing the A7. In existing sections of the motorway, improvements include the straightening of dangerous curves, constructing new tunnels, completing the Artemision tunnel, adding more light fixtures and upgrading the median throughout.

Length
Corinth to Tripoli: 74 km (46 mi)
Corinth to Kalamata: 147 km (91 mi)
Lefktro to Sparta: 45,5 km (28 mi)
Total length: 205 km (127 mi)

History and additional information
The Corinth-Tripoli segment was constructed between 1984 and 1990. It officially became part of the Greek road network in 1992. Prior to that, the Greek National Road 7 (GR-7) was the only road connecting Corinth and Tripoli via Nemea / Dervenakia, Argos and Achladokampos. This was a two-lane road with dangerous curves, especially in the "Kolosoúrtis" (Κωλοσούρτης) section west of Myli; the road exists to this day and is open to local traffic. The A7 motorway has been credited with spearheading Tripoli's economic growth. The southern end is also the ring road of Kalamata city, distributing to the local agriculture and industrial economy, as well. In the late months of 2016 the road became fully operative from one end to the other.

Notes

External links
 
 

7
National